On the First Principles (Greek: Περὶ Ἀρχῶν / Peri Archon; Latin: De Principiis) is a theological treatise by the Christian writer Origen. It was the first systematic exposition of Christian theology.

When Origen was around forty-five years of age, he interrupted his burgeoning program of scriptural exegesis to write Peri Archon. In this work he provided a unified discussion of Christian teachings so that his readers could probe more deeply into the church's rule of faith and discriminate among conflicting scriptural interpretations that were swirling through Alexandria in the late 220's. After completing this treatise, Origen resumed his biblical scholarship, likely viewing Peri Archon as a detour, perhaps even a necessary one, but nevertheless still a detour from his larger project of scriptural interpretation.

Fragments from Books 3.1 and 4.1-3 of Origen's Greek original are preserved in Origen's Philocalia. A few smaller quotations of the original Greek are preserved in Justinian's Letter to Mennas. The vast majority of the text has only survived in a heavily abridged Latin translation produced by Tyrannius Rufinus in 397. Rufinus was convinced that Origen's original treatise had been interpolated by heretics and that these interpolations were the source of the heterodox teachings found in it. He therefore heavily modified Origen's text, omitting and altering any parts which disagreed with contemporary Christian orthodoxy. Jerome was so appalled by Rufinus's lack of fidelity to the original Greek that he resolved to produce his own Latin translation of On the First Principles in which he would translate every word exactly as it was written and lay bare Origen's heresies to the whole world. Jerome's translation, however, has been lost in its entirety.

On the First Principles begins with an essay explaining the nature of theology. Book One describes the heavenly world, and includes descriptions of the oneness of God, the relationship between the three persons of the Trinity, the nature of the divine spirit, reason, and angels. Book Two describes the world of man, including the incarnation of the Logos, the soul, free will, and eschatology. Book Three deals with cosmology, sin, and redemption. Book Four deals with teleology and the interpretation of the Scriptures.

References

Bibliography

External links
 English translation of De Principiis at New Advent

220s
3rd-century Christian texts
Christian theology books
Greek literature (post-classical)
Works by Origen